Esther Marley Conwell (May 23, 1922 – November 16, 2014) was a pioneering American chemist and physicist, best known for the Conwell-Weisskopf theory that describes how electrons travel through semiconductors, a breakthrough that helped revolutionize modern computing. During her life, she was described as one of the most important women in science.

Conwell studied properties of semiconductors and organic conductors, especially electron transport. In 1990, she became an adjunct professor at the University of Rochester while still working at Xerox. In 1998, she joined the University of Rochester faculty full-time as a professor of chemistry, focused on the flow of electrons through DNA.

Conwell held four patents and published more than 270 papers and multiple textbooks over the course of her career. Her textbook, High Field Transport in Semiconductors, became the authoritative text in the field. She received numerous honors, including the National Medal of Science in 2009.

Education
Conwell obtained a physics B.A. from Brooklyn College in 1942. She then went to the University of Rochester to complete a M.S. in physics in 1945 with Victor Weisskopf. She initially planned to do a Ph.D. at Rochester, but since her adviser left to work at Los Alamos after her first year there, she completed her masters and obtained a Ph.D. at a later point in time. Conwell collaborated with Karl Lark-Horovitz and Vivian Johnson at Purdue University on silicon and germanium semiconductor physics. Her masters was initially classified then finally declassified in 1945 and subsequently her M.S. was awarded in which she determined the Conwell-Weisskopf theory. Conwell received her physics Ph.D. in 1948, from the University of Chicago under the advisement of Nobel Laureate Subrahmanyan Chandrasekhar at Yerkes Observatory and was also an assistant to Enrico Fermi. She was  a teaching assistant at Chicago and graded the work of Nobel Laureates such as Chen-Ning Yang and Owen Chamberlain.

Career
After her first year of graduate school, she was employed by Western Electric as an assistant engineer.  At the time, payroll did not have a job title code for female assistant engineers so her title was changed to engineers assistant and her pay reduced to fit an existing code.

She was an instructor in physics at Brooklyn College (1946–1951). She then worked as a researcher at Bell Laboratories (1951–1952) where she studied with William Shockley on the effects of high electric fields on electron transport in semiconductors.  She then became a staff member at Sylvania which was then taken over by GTE Laboratories (1952–1972). In 1972 she joined the Xerox Wilson Research Center, where she was a Research Fellow from 1981 to 1998. At Xerox, she investigated transport and optical properties of doped polymers such as those used for photoreceptors in copiers. Conwell was the Associate Director of the NSF Center for Photoinduced Charge Transfer at University of Rochester starting in 1991. She spent a year as a visiting professor at École Normale Supérieure in 1962 and a semester as the Abby Rockefeller Mauzé Professor at MIT in 1972.

Honors and awards
Conwell was made a fellow of the IEEE in 1980 “for contributions to semiconductor theory, particularly transport in both low and high electric fields.”
She was also a fellow of the American Physical Society. She is one of the few who have the triple membership in the National Academy of Engineering, National Academy of Sciences, and the American Academy of Arts and Sciences (1992) and is the only member of the University of Rochester to achieve this.

She had received the Achievement Award of the Society of Women Engineers (1960) and an Honorary D.Sc. from Brooklyn College in 1992.

In 1997 she received the IEEE Edison Medal for "fundamental contributions to transport theory in semiconductor and organic conductors, and their application to the semiconductor, electronic copying and printing industries." She was the first woman to win this award. Other notable awardees include Alexander Graham Bell, Vannevar Bush, and Michael Pupin.

In November 2002, Discover magazine listed Conwell as one of the 50 most important women scientists at the time.

In 2004 she received a Dreyfus Senior Faculty Mentor Award for serving as a research mentor to undergraduates. In 2006, the University of Rochester honored Conwell with a Susan B. Anthony Lifetime Achievement Award for her efforts in advocating and promoting women in science.

The ACS Award for Encouraging Women into Careers in the Chemical Sciences was awarded to her in 2008.

In 2009, Conwell received the prestigious National Medal of Science from President Barack Obama, for "her broad contributions to understanding electron and hole transport in semiconducting materials, which helped to enable commercial applications of semiconductor and organic electronic devices, and for extending her analysis to studying the electronic properties of DNA." She was nominated by Mildred Dresselhaus, a professor of physics and electrical engineering at MIT and a National Medals of Science winner.

Personal life
Ester Conwell was born in 1922 in New York City. She had two sisters and both of her parents were immigrants.

Her son, Lewis Rothberg, is also a tenured professor of Physics, Physical Chemistry, and Chemical Engineering at the University of Rochester; his research focuses on organic electronics and biomolecular sensing using laser energetics.

On November 16, 2014, Conwell was walking when she was struck by her neighbor's car as he was backing out of his driveway. Capt. David Catholdi of the Brighton Police Department stated that alcohol and speed were not factors in the incident. She was taken to Strong Memorial Hospital, where she died from her injuries several hours later. She was 92 years old and was still actively pursuing research.

References

External links
 Oral History interview transcript with Esther M. Conwell on 22 January 2007, American Institute of Physics, Niels Bohr Library and Archives
 Biography of Conwell from IEEE

American electrical engineers
Semiconductor physicists
1922 births
2014 deaths
American women engineers
Fellow Members of the IEEE
Members of the United States National Academy of Engineering
Members of the United States National Academy of Sciences
IEEE Edison Medal recipients
National Medal of Science laureates
Scientists at Bell Labs
University of Rochester faculty
Brooklyn College alumni
University of Chicago alumni
University of Rochester alumni
20th-century American engineers
20th-century American physicists
20th-century American women scientists
Fellows of the American Academy of Arts and Sciences
Fellows of the American Physical Society
20th-century women engineers
American women academics
21st-century American women